was a counselor of the first rank in the Imperial court of Japan. The role dates from the 7th century.

This advisory position remained a part of the Imperial court from the 8th century until the Meiji period in the 19th century.

The post was created in 702 by the Taihō Code, and evolved out of the earlier post Oimonomōsu-tsukasa. Holders of the office were of the Senior Third Rank.  They assisted the Minister of the Left (the Sadaijin) and the Minister of the Right (the Udaijin).

By the mid-17th century, the Dainagon counselor or state, was expected to work closely the Minister of the Center (the Naidaijin), whose position ranked just below the Udaijin and the Sadaijin.  This court position evolved to ensure that someone will be always prepared to replace or assist the main court officials if, for any reason, it should be impossible for one of the two senior counselors to devote himself to his duties and responsibilities in all matters.

The Dainagon ranked just above all other kuge in the kugyō except the Daijō-daijin, Udaijin, Sadaijin, and Naidaijin.

This ancient office would have been roughly equivalent to that of vice-minister in the modern cabinet system. It was abolished in 1871.

Dainagon in context
Any exercise of meaningful powers of court officials in the pre-Meiji period reached its nadir during the years of the Tokugawa shogunate, and yet the core structures of ritsuryō government did manage to endure for centuries.

In order to appreciate the office of Dainagon, it is necessary to evaluate its role in the traditional Japanese context of a durable yet flexible framework.  In this bureaucratic network and a hierarchy of functionaries, the Dainagon functioned like mouthpieces to and from the board, and in consultation with the board.

The role of Dainagon was an important element in the  Daijō-kan (Council of State). The Daijō-kan schema proved to be adaptable in the creation of constitutional government in the modern period.

Highest Daijō-kan officials
The highest positions in the court hierarchy can be cataloged.  A dry list provides a superficial glimpse inside the complexity and inter-connected relationships of the Imperial court structure.
  Daijō-daijin (Chancellor of the Realm or Chief Minister). 
  Sadaijin (Minister of the Left).
  Udaijin (Minister of the Right).
  Naidaijin (Minister of the Center).

The next highest tier of officials were:
  Dainagon (Major counselor, chief counselor of state).  There are commonly three Dainagon;  sometimes more.
  Chūnagon (Middle counselor).
  Shōnagon (Minor counselor); there are commonly three Shōnagon.

Other high-ranking bureaucrats who function somewhat flexibly within the Daijō-kan were; 
 Sangi (Associate counselor).   This office functions as a manager of Daijō-kan activities within the palace.
   (Secretariat).  These are specifically named men who act at the sole discretion of the emperor.

The Eight Ministries
The government ministries were eight semi-independent bureaucracies.  A list alone cannot reveal much about the actual functioning of the Daijō-kan, but the broad hierarchical categories do suggest the way in which governmental functions were parsed:

The specific ministries above are not grouped arbitrarily. The two court officials below had responsibility for them as follows:
   This administrator was charged or tasked with supervising four ministries: Center, Civil Services, Ceremonies, and Taxation.
   This administrator was charged or tasked with supervising four ministries: Military, Justice, Treasury and Imperial Household.

See also
 Daijō-kan
 Sesshō and Kampaku
 Kōkyū
 Kuge
 Imperial Household Agency

Notes

References
 Dickson, Walter G. and Mayo Williamson Hazeltine. (1898).   "The Eight Boards of Government" in Japan. New York: P. F. Collier. OCLC 285881
 Nussbaum, Louis Frédéric and Käthe Roth. (2005). "Chunagon" in   Japan Encyclopedia. Cambridge: Harvard University Press. ; OCLC 48943301
 Ozaki, Yukio. (2001).  The Autobiography of Ozaki Yukio: The Struggle for Constitutional Government in Japan, translated by Fujiko Hara. Princeton: Princeton University Press. ; OCLC 123043741
 . (1955). 尾崎咢堂全集. 第11卷, 咢堂自伝: 日本憲政史を語る (Ozaki gakudō zenshū. 11, Gakudō jiden: nihon kenseishi o kataru) Tokyo: Kōronsha. OCLC 672920518
 Sansom, George (1958). A History of Japan to 1334.] Stanford: Stanford University Press. ; 
 Screech, Timon. (2006). Secret Memoirs of the Shoguns:  Isaac Titsingh and Japan, 1779–1822. London: Routledge Curzon.  	; OCLC 65177072
 Titsingh, Isaac. (1834). Nihon Ōdai Ichiran; ou,  Annales des empereurs du Japon.  Paris: Royal Asiatic Society, Oriental Translation Fund of Great Britain and Ireland. OCLC 5850691
 Varley, H. Paul. (1980).  Jinnō Shōtōki: A Chronicle of Gods and Sovereigns. New York: Columbia University Press. ; OCLC 59145842-4

Further reading
 Dickenson, Walter G. (1869). Japan: Being a Sketch of the History, Government and Officers of the Empire. London: W. Blackwood and Sons. 

Government of feudal Japan